Alexandru Maximov (born 8 July 1982) is a Moldovan footballer who plays as forward.

Honous

Individual
Milsami Orhei
Moldovan National Division Top scorer: 2009–10 (13 goals; joint with Jymmy França)

References

External links

Alexandru Maximov at sports.md
Alexandru Maximov at divizianationala.com
Alexandru Maximov at football.com
Alexandru Maximov at soccerstats247.com

Living people
1982 births
Association football forwards
Moldovan footballers
CS Tiligul-Tiras Tiraspol players
Moldovan Super Liga players
FC Milsami Orhei players